Maria Asanina Palaiologina (died 19 December 1477), better known as Maria of Mangup or Maria of Doros, was the second wife of Prince Stephen the Great (reigned 1457–1504) and as such Princess consort of Moldavia from September 1472 to 1475 or 1477. Of uncertain parentage, but most likely a descendant of imperial Bulgarian and Byzantine dynasties, she belonged to the ruling class of the small Crimean Principality of Theodoro. Her close relatives included both warring princes of Theodoro, Alexios II and Isaac, as well as Zuan Tzamplakon, diplomat and leader of Stratioti.

With her arrival in Moldavia, Maria underscored the relative impact of Byzantine politics and culture at Stephen's court. She also accepted Byzantine communion with the Catholics, acting as an agent of Catholic influence before returning to Eastern Orthodoxy. Stephen likely married her for political reasons, hoping to conquer the principality, though he lost interest in her when that proved impossible. According to conflicting readings, the Prince either divorced her to marry the Wallachian Maria Voichița (who in any case became her successor), or she lived estranged from Stephen without a formal separation. Her portrait is mysteriously absent from a miniature of the Humor Monastery Gospel, possibly removed by her husband.

Various late records place Maria Asanina in Eastern Moldavia or on Mount Athos. Her marriage to Stephen had produced as many as five children, of whom only one daughter, Ana, is believed to have survived into adulthood. Maria's elaborate burial shroud, featuring her portrait and Palaiologan insignia, is preserved in Putna Monastery, where she was buried. It endures as a significant landmark in medieval Romanian art, synthesizing Western and Eastern handicrafts. Maria's marriage was fictionalized by Mihail Sadoveanu in Frații Jderi. This 1935 novel is the basis for a 1974 feature film, in which Maria was portrayed by Violeta Andrei.

Biography

Origins
A daughter of the ruler of the Principality of Theodoro (or "Gothia") in the Crimea, on her mother's side she was a likely descendant of two imperial houses, the Palaiologos dynasty of the Byzantine Empire and the Asen dynasty of the Second Bulgarian Empire. Scholars such as Ivan Bozhilov argue that, on her father's side, Maria also descended from the Gabras aristocratic family of Byzantium. This is dismissed as "groundless" by another historian, Ștefan S. Gorovei, who notes that Maria's blood links with the Palaiologos and the Byzantine branch of the Asenids were likely strong. She is mentioned in the Gustynskaia Chronicle as cousins ("second sisters") with Sophia Palaiologina of Muscovy. Through this connection, she was probably a niece of Trebizond's reigning couple, Emperor David and Empress Maria. Historians such as A. D. Xenopol, Orest Tafrali, and Constantin Gane also held the belief that Maria was a Komnenid. The notion was preserved in later academia by Răzvan Theodorescu, who sees Maria as having "the blood of Greek basileis, Komnenes and Palaiologoi". According to Octavean-Radu Ivan, she "had tight connections" with the Komnenids through the Trebizond dynasty.

Beyond his being a Prince of Theodoro, her father's exact identity is disputed among historians. According to Aurelian Sacerdoțeanu, such mentions refer to Olubei, son of Alexios I. Bozhilov describes Maria as the daughter of either Olubei or his direct predecessor John, who was married to a Maria Tzamplakina Palaiologina Asanina. Similarly, genealogist Marcel Romanescu lists her as the daughter of "John Olubei" and "Maria Asen Palaiologos", and Xenopol simply as Oludbei's daughter. Gane refers to "Maria's father, Olobei Comnen". Alexander Vasiliev sees her as a sister of Isaac, who was probably Olubei's son, and of Alexios II. A more skeptical view was offered in 1981 by historian D. Năstase, who believed that Maria was the daughter of a lesser Byzantine refugee in the Republic of Venice, Zuan Tzamplakon "Palaiologos". Her "imperial ascendancy, real or fake, was nonetheless Byzantine." According to Gorovei, Tzamplakon was in reality one of Maria's uncles, and himself not a full member of the Palaiologos clan.

Maria of Mangup's parents left for Trebizond in 1446 or 1447, which leaves her apparent presence in Mangup until her move to Suceava and marriage unexplained. Moldavia's German Chronicle, compiled late during Stephen's reign, links Maria with the Caucasus, describing her as a "Circassian". This remark, Vasiliev notes, is "completely obscure", with no other record substantiating the "Circassian" claim. He proposes that such a confusion in the text might be connected to the "not very reliable" story according to which some "Gothic" princes had settled in Phanagoria. In 1999, genealogist Sorin Iftimi noted that the statement in the German Chronicle had still not been elucidated by historians.

As recounted by Vasiliev, Maria arrived in Moldavia on 4 September 1472. However, other scholars place the event almost a full year before that, to 14 September 1471. The marriage, which took place on 14 September 1472, was probably contracted for political reasons. As noted by historian Constantin Iordachi, her presence in Moldavia formed part of a "multifaceted influence" of post-Byzantine polities, which at that phase was still "direct". The dynastic union also had advantages for the Moldavian side: according to Gane, Stephen "struck big". Another researcher, Alexandru Simon, notes that the matrimonial arrangement "had [...] fortified [Stephen's] position and interests in the Black Sea area", while also annulling a previous submission to the Ottoman Empire. One scholarly theory, embraced by both Vasiliev and Tafrali, suggests that Stephen, a powerful ruler and "Athlete of Christ", married Maria in order to be able to lay claim on the throne of Byzantium should Constantinople be retaken from the Ottoman Turks. This interpretation was rejected by various other scholars.

Princess consort of Moldavia
The Princess was also involved in the conflict of influence over Stephen and his Moldavian Metropolis. By the time of her move to Moldavia, Maria and her Theodoro relatives supported the attempted Catholic–Orthodox union and its Latin Patriarchate of Constantinople, being especially close to Basilios Bessarion. The project also involved John, the Metropolitan of Gothia, who networked between Theodoro, Moldavia, and the Kingdom of Hungary. Zuan Tzamplakon, who had negotiated Maria's marriage to Stephen, also acted as Bessarion's personal envoy. With Maria, he managed to steer Stephen closer to the Catholic world. As noted by scholar Dan Ioan Mureșan, Tzamplakon and Maria's work may have strained Stephen's relationship with the Orthodox Patriarch of Constantinople and the local church hierarchy, including Bishop Teoctist. This, he argues, is why Maria appears as a blank space in the Gospel of Humor Monastery: "the monk Nicodim [...] simply refused to depict [Stephen's] new wife". Other researches believe that Maria was painted in that miniature, but then erased on Stephen's orders.

According to Gane, Stephen had no children by Maria. Other sources confirm that the couple had two daughters, one of whom was probably named Ana; the other one remains anonymous, only known through two references in the German Chronicle. Sacerdoțeanu also proposes that Maria was the mother of two sons, the twins Bogdan (ca. 1473–1479) and Iliaș, and possibly a third, Petrașco, all of whom are buried at Putna Monastery. Gane describes Bogdan and Petrașco as born to Evdochia of Kiev, Stephen's previous wife, and Iliaș as born from an even earlier marriage. According to Gorovei, Maria acted as tutor to Alexandru "Sandrin", Evdochia's son, and may have inspired the young heir's interest in Asenid family history.

Stephen was angered when the Theodoro Byzantines accepted Ottoman and Crimean Khanate overlords, and negotiated an alliance with the Republic of Genoa, which held Caffa, on the other side of the peninsula. He also equipped an expedition which saw Isaac deposed and replaced with the anti-Ottoman Alexios II. Stephen's marriage, Vasiliev notes, allowed him to exercise "exceptional influence on Gothia", and he was "perhaps [considering] even taking possession" of Theodoro. The latter is also argued by Xenopol and Gane. Both Xenopol and Vasiliev note Stephen's alarm in June 1475, when Caffa fell to the Ottomans. Overall, however, Maria appears to have been largely ignored by her husband and led an unhappy family life until her death, some two years later.

Xenopol suggests that, shortly into their marriage, Stephen had fallen in love with his hostage Maria Voichița, daughter of Radu III the Handsome of Wallachia. The same is argued by Gane, who further speculates that a "horrific drama must have taken place in the citadel of Suceava, and many tears must have been shed by the Lady in her quarters." Xenopol and Vasiliev both argue that Stephen lost any interest in Maria once Theodoro was conquered by the Ottomans in December 1475 and he had abandoned his hopes of capturing the Crimean principality. A Genoese record suggests that in May 1476 Stephen was trying to obtain an amnesty for Alexios, who was ultimately executed by his Ottoman captors.

Apparent withdrawal and death
The fall of Theodoro was a final chapter in the efforts to make Stephen embrace Catholicism. In her final years, as Mureșan notes, Maria of Mangup had returned into the fold of Constantinople Orthodoxy. Tradition credits her as one of the donors of Neamț Monastery, with an icon of the Theotokos (Virgin and Child). Various records also suggest that she was living in solitude, away from the court. In July 1476, as the Crimean Khanate invaded Eastern Moldavia, Maria was recorded among the refugees at Khotyn or Costești. According to oral tradition, she lived in the Costești cave now known as Stânca Doamnei (Lady's Cliff). Other records suggest that she returned to Suceava following Stephen's defeat at Valea Albă, still acting as his faithful wife and inquiring about his whereabouts.

An undated inscription in the katholikon (main church) of the Osiou Gregoriou monastery on Mount Athos mentions that "the most pious Maria Asanina Palaiologina, lady of Moldovlachia" prayed there during her time as Princess consort. This offering may nevertheless refer not to Maria of Mangop, but to her posthumous daughter-in-law by Sandrin, known from other records simply as a Phanariote aristocrat. A "lady Maria" appears mentioned in an undated letter sent by the Orthodox Patriarch. Mureșan argues that this friendly text refers to her husband, rather than to a previous Prince Stephen, as has been argued by other experts, but concedes that "lady Maria" may not be Maria of Mangop. He dates the text to a generic period when Stephen had reaffirmed his Byzantine Orthodoxy.

According to her tombstone at Putna, Maria died on 19 December "6985" (Anno Mundi), which various historians read as AD 1477. Scholar Petre Ș. Năsturel explains that earlier readings as "1476" were based on the false assumption that the Moldavian year began on 1 September rather than 1 January. Likewise, Gane concludes that the event took place during the fasting for Christmas Eve 1477, and describes "1476" as an anomalous reading. The princess' funeral service was delivered by Teoctist, who had apparently reconciled with her.

Stephen took for his third wife Maria Voichița—who was herself related, more distantly, to the Palaiologoi. According to Xenopol, the chronicler Grigore Ureche is right to argue that Stephen had taken the new Maria as his wife as early as 1475, since he and Maria of Mangop were effectively divorced by then. The German Chronicle records this new wedding as having occurred in December 1477, which, if true, would have broken the widower's mourning taboo. Various scholars agree that the text must be in this respect erroneous. Gane also pushes the date for Stephen's new marriage to 1480, "whether because he wished to mourn properly, or because [Maria Voichița] was still too young". Tzamplakon probably left Moldavia shortly before or after his protector's death, returning to fight for Venice and leading her Stratioti in the War of Ferrara. Of Maria's putative children, Ana survived to at least 1499, and is believed to have been entombed by Sandrin's side at Bistrița Monastery.

In culture
Kept at Putna, now located in Romania, Maria of Mangup's elaborate burial shroud bears the following inscription, embroidered in Cyrillic:

Fashion historian Jennifer M. Scarce reviews the shroud as the first sample of an "apparently unique" theme in Romanian religious handicrafts, with "the dead person richly dressed in court robes." The embroidery features two monograms reading "Asanina" and "Palaiologina" and two double-headed eagles, a symbol of Byzantium, in each of the four corners. As argued by historian Hugo Buchtal, the eagle and other elements of Palaiologan insignia are there to underscore Maria's Byzantine heritage and "imperial program". The shroud, sewn of red silk and with gold thread embroidery, depicts the Princess consort lying within an arch in her tomb in a blue-grey ceremonial garment decorated with stylized flowers and a high crown and pendants on her head. Năsturel describes the central figurative image as a "discreet evocation of the past, though one of painful solitude."

Art historian Ernst Diez considers this to be the earliest burial shroud portrait discovered in a Romanian monastery as well as "harmonious" and "the most beautiful one in the group" he analyzed. The shroud measures . Stylistically, it belongs to Byzantine art, though with some Western influences, bringing together echoes of Gothic art and Islamic geometric patterns. Scarce also notes that costume worn by Maria is a sample of Ottoman clothing, the zerbaft, "probably the earliest" such depiction in Romanian art. Additionally, art historians Lilia Dergaciova and Svetlana Reabțeva discuss the influence of Mongol handicrafts in her jewelry, proposing that Maria may have ordered Moldavian artisans to learn Crimean techniques.

Researcher Anca Păunescu praises this "unique work" and "masterpiece" of "wide-ranging humanist inspiration". The shroud, she notes, attests "the greatest phase of magnificence in Moldavian-style embroidery", and through it the political and cultural stability enforced by Stephen. According to Năsturel, the shroud's very existence shows that a "refined civilization [...] of the Byzantine world had come to flourish at Stephen's court". Similarly, Theodorescu sees the object as evidence of a "multicultural Romanian world", an "aesthetic mutation" serving Stephen's "geopolitics". The depiction of double-headed eagles and a "princely cortege" on a period stove from Vaslui has led some researches to suggest that Maria's imperial pedigree had also seeped into folk art. Their hypothesis remains controversial. Another dispute surrounds the presence of a heraldic sun in some of Stephen's princely arms. Heraldist Grigore Jitaru proposes that it stands for the Theodoro marriage, but his hypothesis was rejected by another scholar, Tudor-Radu Tiron.

Maria is also the subject of several portrayals in Romanian literature and related media. Her wedding to Stephen forms a major episode in Mihail Sadoveanu's 1935 novel, Frații Jderi. Her welcoming to Moldavia is meant to highlight Stephen's patriotism and his guarantees of tranquility: the fictional Maria is overwhelmed by feelings of "peace and leisure" upon first meeting him. Depicted as a political act by Sadoveanu, the wedding ceremony also overlaps with Stephen's hunting trip and initiation by a hermit. The novel has inspired a 1974 film, in which Maria is played by Violeta Andrei, with Gheorghe Cozorici as Stephen. Another interwar writer, Ana Bucur, also contributed a historical play entirely centered on Maria's life in Moldavia. In 2013, the princess' biography inspired a song by Maria Gheorghiu. This was later included into a musical, Sub zodia Mariei ("Under the Sign of Mary"), which also featured Gheorghiu's homages to Marie of Romania and Maria Tănase.

References

Sources

Year of birth unknown
1477 deaths
Royal consorts of Moldavia
15th-century Byzantine people
15th-century Romanian women
Asen dynasty
Palaiologos dynasty
Stephen the Great
Medieval Crimea
Crimean Greeks
People of the Empire of Trebizond
Romanian people of Bulgarian descent
Romanian people of Greek descent
Romanian Eastern Catholics
Eastern Orthodox Christians from Romania
Converts to Eastern Orthodoxy from Catholicism
Burials at Putna Monastery
People associated with Gregoriou Monastery